A rocket garden is a display of missiles, sounding rockets, or space launch vehicles, usually in an outdoor setting. The proper form of the term usually refers to the Rocket Garden at the Kennedy Space Center Visitor Complex.

All rockets that have flown so far are at least partially expendable (in some rockets, certain stages or boosters get reused), so rockets in displays have not been flown. As in the case of the Saturn V, later planned missions were cancelled, leaving unneeded rockets for the museums. For displays of early American space hardware, such as Project Mercury and Project Gemini, surplus missiles have been painted to look like crewed space launch vehicles. Engineering test articles (such as the Space Shuttle Pathfinder stack in Huntsville) or purpose-built full-scale replicas are also displayed in rocket gardens.

Examples
 Woomera, South Australia
 , Le Bourget, France
 Historical Technical Museum, Peenemünde, Germany
 U.S. Space & Rocket Center, Huntsville, Alabama
 Air Force Space and Missile Museum, Cape Canaveral Space Force Station, Cape Canaveral, Florida
 Kennedy Space Center, Merritt Island, Florida
 Goddard Space Flight Center, Greenbelt, Maryland
 New Mexico Museum of Space History, Alamogordo, New Mexico
 National Museum of Nuclear Science & History, Albuquerque, New Mexico
 White Sands Missile Range, near Las Cruces, New Mexico
 1964 New York World's Fairgrounds, Flushing Meadows Park, New York; now the New York Hall of Science
 National Museum of the United States Air Force, Wright-Patterson Air Force Base, Dayton, Ohio
 Fort Sill, Lawton, Oklahoma
 SpaceX Starbase, Boca Chica, Texas
 Space Center Houston, Johnson Space Center, Houston, Texas
 Thiokol, near Promontory, Utah
 Air Power Park, Hampton, Virginia
 Wallops Flight Facility Visitor Center, Wallops Island, Virginia
 National Air and Space Museum, Washington, D.C. (indoors)
 Francis E. Warren Air Force Base, Cheyenne, Wyoming

Photos

See also
 
 Rock garden, likely the inspiration of the term "rocket garden"
 Sculpture garden, another example of a "garden" displaying nonliving, humanmade objects

References

External links

 Kennedy Space Center Rocket Garden
 United States manned space boosters on display from A Field Guide to American Spacecraft

Rocket sculptures
Military and war museums
Open-air museums
Space-related tourist attractions
Garden
Cold War museums
History of spaceflight